Syromastus rhombeus, sometimes called the "rhombic leatherbug" is a species of European bugs in the family Coreidae, tribe Coreini.

References

External links

Dyntaxa: Syromastus rhombeus

Coreini
Hemiptera of Europe